The Fisher Power Station is a conventional hydroelectric power station located in north-western Tasmania, Australia.

Technical details
Part of the MerseyForth scheme that comprises eight hydroelectric power stations, the Fisher Power Station is the second station in the scheme. The power station is located in the upper reaches of the Fisher River. The station is supplied with water from Lake Mackenzie, supplemented by water run-off from the
plateau and by water pumped from Yeates Creek and Parsons Falls pumping stations. Water flow to the station is via a -long flume, siphon and canal and then a -long vertical shaft, inclined shaft, tunnel and surface penstock. The water descends  from the lake to the power station and then flows  before flowing into Lake Parangana (see Parangana Power Station).

The station output, estimated to be  annually, is fed through an 11 kV air-blast circuit breaker to TasNetworks' transmission grid via an 11 kV/220 kV Siemens generator transformer T1 and a second transformer T2, accepts the station 22 kV output from Rowallan Power Station.

See also

 List of power stations in Tasmania

References

Energy infrastructure completed in 1973
Hydroelectric power stations in Tasmania
Northern Tasmania
Mersey River (Tasmania)